Pilea glaucophylla, the silver-leaved artillery plant, is a species of flowering plant in the family Urticaceae, native to Colombia.

References

Flora of Colombia
glaucophylla